Hans Pieter Atze Oskamp (12 December 1936 in Haren – 15 July 1990 in Madeira) was a Dutch politician and linguist. In 1965, he worked as a scholar at the Dublin Institute for Advanced Studies for the school of Celtic Studies.

References

1936 births
1990 deaths
Celtic studies scholars
Labour Party (Netherlands) politicians
Linguists from the Netherlands
Members of the Senate (Netherlands)
People from Haren, Groningen
University of Amsterdam alumni
University of Groningen alumni
20th-century linguists
Academics of the Dublin Institute for Advanced Studies